The XXIV 2022 Pan Am Badminton Championships was a continental championships tournament of badminton for the Americas. It was held in San Salvador, El Salvador from 26 to 29 April.

Tournament 
The individual event of 2022 Pan Am Badminton Championships was a 25th edition of the Pan American Badminton Championships.

Venue 
The individual event is being held at Palacio de los Deportes Carlos "El Famoso" Hernández in the city of San Salvador, El Salvador.

Point distribution
Below is the tables with the point distribution for each phase of the tournament based on the BWF points system for the Pan American Badminton Championships, which is equivalent to a Super 300 event.

Medalists

Medal table

Individual events

Individual event

Men's singles

Seeds

 Brian Yang (final)
 Kevin Cordón (champion)
 Jason Ho-Shue (quarter-finals)
 Ygor Coelho (semi-finals)
 Lino Muñoz (third round)
 B. R. Sankeerth (quarter-finals)
 Luis Montoya (second round)
 Job Castillo (quarter-finals)

Finals

Top half

Section 1

Section 2

Bottom half

Section 3

Section 4

Women's singles

Seeds

 Michelle Li (champion)
 Beiwen Zhang (final)
 Iris Wang (semi-finals)
 Lauren Lam (third round)
 Zhang Wenyu (quarter-finals)
 Haramara Gaitan (quarter-finals)
 Talia Ng (quarter-finals)
 Nikté Sotomayor (third round)

Finals

Top half

Section 1

Section 2

Bottom half

Section 3

Section 4

Men's doubles

Seeds

 Aníbal Marroquín / Jonathan Solís (second round)
 Job Castillo / Luis Montoya (champions)
 Rubén Castellanos / Christopher Martínez (second round)
 Shae Michael Martin / Gavin Robinson (withdrew)

Finals

Top half

Section 1

Section 2

Bottom half

Section 3

Section 4

Women's doubles

Seeds 

 Rachel Honderich / Kristen Tsai (champions)
 Catherine Choi / Josephine Wu (final)
 Jaqueline Lima / Sâmia Lima (second round)
 Diana Corleto / Nikté Sotomayor (second round)

Finals

Top half

Section 1

Section 2

Bottom half

Section 3

Section 4

Mixed doubles

Seeds

 Fabricio Farias / Jaqueline Lima (quarter-finals)
 Jonathan Solís / Diana Corleto (final)
 Vinson Chiu / Jennie Gai (Quarter finals)
 Nicolas Nguyen / Alexandra Mocanu (quarter-finals)
 Christopher Martínez / Mariana Paiz (second round)
 Ty Alexander Lindeman / Josephine Wu (champions)
 Andy Baque / Maria Delia Zambrano (withdrew)
 José Orellana / Daniela Hernández (second round)

Finals

Top half

Section 1

Section 2

Bottom half

Section 3

Section 4

References

External links
Tournament link: individual results

Pan Am Badminton Championships
Pan Am Badminton Championships
Pan Am Badminton Championships
Pan Am Badminton Championships
Badminton tournaments in El Salvador
International sports competitions hosted by El Salvador